The 2018 Tour de Pologne was a road cycling stage race that took place between 4 and 10 August in Poland. It was the 75th edition of the Tour de Pologne and the twenty-eighth event of the 2018 UCI World Tour.

Schedule

Teams
As the 2018 Tour de Pologne was a UCI World Tour event, all eighteen UCI WorldTeams were invited automatically and obliged to enter a team into the race. Along with a Polish national team, three other squads were given wildcard places into the race, and as such, formed the event's 22-team peloton.

Stages

Stage 1
4 August 2018 – Main Square, Kraków to Kraków,

Stage 2
5 August 2018 – Tarnowskie Góry to Katowice, 

Stage 3
6 August 2018 – Silesian Stadium, Chorzów to Zabrze,

Stage 4
7 August 2018 – Jaworzno to Szczyrk,

Stage 5
8 August 2018 – Wieliczka Salt Mine to Bielsko-Biała,

Stage 6
9 August 2018 – Zakopane to Terma Bukowina Tatrzańska,

Stage 7
10 August 2018 – Terma Bukowina Tatrzańska to Bukowina Tatrzańska,

Classification leadership table
In the 2018 Tour de Pologne, four different jerseys were awarded. The general classification was calculated by adding each cyclist's finishing times on each stage, and allowing time bonuses for the first three finishers at intermediate sprints (three seconds to first, two seconds to second and one second to third) and at the finish of all stages: the stage winner won a ten-second bonus, with six and four seconds for the second and third riders respectively. The leader of the classification received a yellow jersey; it was considered the most important of the Tour de Pologne, and the winner of the classification was considered the winner of the race.

There was also a mountains classification, the leadership of which was marked by a purple jersey. In the mountains classification, points towards the classification were won by reaching the top of a climb before other cyclists. Each climb was categorised as either first, second, third, or fourth-category, with more points available for the higher-categorised climbs. Double points were also awarded for the premier first-category climb on the final stage.

Additionally, there was a sprints classification, which awarded a white jersey. In the points classification, cyclists received points for finishing in the top 20 in a stage. For winning a stage, a rider earned 20 points, with a point fewer per place down to 1 point for 20th place. The fourth and final jersey represented the active rider classification, marked by a blue jersey. This was decided at the race's intermediate sprints, awarding points on a 3–2–1 scale.

There was also a classification for Polish riders, with the highest-placed rider appearing on the podium each day. As well as this, a teams classification was also calculated, in which the times of the best three cyclists per team on each stage were added together; the leading team at the end of the race was the team with the lowest total time.

References

Sources

External links

2018
2018 UCI World Tour
2018 in Polish sport
August 2018 sports events in Europe